The Turhan Cemal Beriker Boulevard is a major thoroughfare through the Seyhan district of Adana, Turkey. With the Girne (Kyrenia) and Cemal Gürsel Boulevards, the Turhan Cemal Beriker Boulevard forms the D400 state roadway through the city of Adana. Historically, the boulevard is located on the P1 state roadway and E5.

In the past, a large volume of freight traffic from Europe passed along this road en route to the Middle East, especially after the opening of the Bosphorus Bridge on 30 October 1973, the 50th anniversary of the founding of the Republic of Turkey. As the economy of Turkey became capable of producing goods for the Middle East, trucks from Europe stopped using this route. The road is named after Turhan Cemal Beriker, former mayor of Adana.

The Turhan Cemal Beriker Boulevard is maintained by both the General Directorate of Highways of the Republic of Turkey, and the Metropolitan Municipality of Adana.

Notes

References

Roads in Turkey